The Amur stonechat or Stejneger's stonechat (Saxicola stejnegeri) is a species of stonechat native to eastern Asia. It breeds in central and eastern Siberia, Japan, Korea, northeastern China, and eastern Mongolia, and migrates south to southern China and Indochina in winter.

It is a small bird 11.5–13 cm long, very closely similar to the Siberian stonechat in both plumage and behaviour, differing in only small details, notably having a slightly broader-based bill 4.7–5.7 mm wide (4.0–4.9 mm wide in Siberian stonechat) and slightly less white on the rump.

Vagrants have been reported west to Great Britain, east to Alaska, and south to Borneo.

Taxonomy
Amur stonechat was generally considered a subspecies of either common stonechat (as Saxicola torquatus stejnegeri) or Siberian stonechat (as Saxicola maurus stejnegeri,), but recent genetic evidence has shown that it is distinct, in a basal position in the common stonechat superspecies; on which basis it is now accepted as a distinct species.

The Latin binomial commemorates the Norwegian ornithologist Leonhard Hess Stejneger.

References

External links
Xeno-canto: audio recordings of Amur stonechat

Saxicola
Birds of Asia
Birds described in 1908